Manzini may refer to:
Manzini, Eswatini, a town in the Manzini Region of Eswatini
Manzini Region, a region of Eswatini
Manzini (surname), an Italian surname

See also
Roman Catholic Diocese of Manzini